Lombardy renewed its delegation to the Italian Senate on April 13, 2008. This election was a part of national Italian general election of 2008 even if, according to the Italian Constitution, every senatorial challenge in each Region is a single and independent race.

The election was won by the centre-right coalition between The People of Freedom and Lega Nord, as it happened at the national level. The People of Freedom was the largest party in the election with 34%, ahead of the Democratic Party (28%) and Lega Nord (21%). All provinces gave a majority or a plurality to the new Prime Minister of Italy.

Electoral law
The new electoral law for the Senate was established in 2005 by the Calderoli Law, and it is a form of semi-proportional representation. A party presents its own closed list and it can join other parties in alliances. The coalition which receives a plurality automatically wins at least 26 seats. Respecting this condition, seats are divided between coalitions, and subsequently to party lists, using the largest remainder method with a Hare quota. To receive seats, a party must overcome the barrage of 8% of the vote if it contests a single race, or of 3% of the vote if it runs in alliance.

Results

|-
|- style="background-color:#E9E9E9"
! rowspan="1" style="text-align:left;vertical-align:top;" |Coalition leader
! rowspan="1" style="text-align:center;vertical-align:top;" |votes
! rowspan="1" style="text-align:center;vertical-align:top;" |votes (%)
! rowspan="1" style="text-align:center;vertical-align:top;" |seats
! rowspan="1" style="text-align:left;vertical-align:top;" |Party
! rowspan="1" style="text-align:center;vertical-align:top;" |votes
! rowspan="1" style="text-align:center;vertical-align:top;" |votes (%)
! rowspan="1" style="text-align:center;vertical-align:top;" |swing
! rowspan="1" style="text-align:center;vertical-align:top;" |seats
! rowspan="1" style="text-align:center;vertical-align:top;" |change
|-
! rowspan="2" style="text-align:left;vertical-align:top;" |Silvio Berlusconi
| rowspan="2" style="vertical-align:top;" |3,139,694
| rowspan="2" style="vertical-align:top;" |55.1
| rowspan="2" style="vertical-align:top;" |30

| style="text-align:left;" |The People of Freedom
| style="vertical-align:top;" |1,959,681
| style="vertical-align:top;" |34.4
| style="vertical-align:top;" |-3.6
| style="vertical-align:top;" |19
| style="vertical-align:top;" |0
|-
| style="text-align:left;" |Lega Nord
| style="vertical-align:top;" |1,180,013
| style="vertical-align:top;" |20.7
| style="vertical-align:top;" |+9.6
| style="vertical-align:top;" |11
| style="vertical-align:top;" |+6

|-
! rowspan="2" style="text-align:left;vertical-align:top;" |Walter Veltroni
| rowspan="2" style="vertical-align:top;" |1,823,835
| rowspan="2" style="vertical-align:top;" |32.0
| rowspan="2" style="vertical-align:top;" |17

| style="text-align:left;" |Democratic Party
| style="vertical-align:top;" |1,607,928
| style="vertical-align:top;" |28.2
| style="vertical-align:top;" |+5.8
| style="vertical-align:top;" |15
| style="vertical-align:top;" |+2
|-
| style="text-align:left;" |Italy of Values
| style="vertical-align:top;" |215,907
| style="vertical-align:top;" |3.8
| style="vertical-align:top;" |+1.2
| style="vertical-align:top;" |2
| style="vertical-align:top;" |+2

|-
! rowspan="1" style="text-align:left;vertical-align:top;" |Pier Ferdinando Casini
| rowspan="1" style="vertical-align:top;" |240,481
| rowspan="1" style="vertical-align:top;" |4.2
| rowspan="1" style="vertical-align:top;" |-

| style="text-align:left;" |Union of the Centre
| style="vertical-align:top;" |240,481
| style="vertical-align:top;" |4.2
| style="vertical-align:top;" |-1.7
| style="vertical-align:top;" |-
| style="vertical-align:top;" |-3

|-
! rowspan="1" style="text-align:left;vertical-align:top;" |Fausto Bertinotti
| rowspan="1" style="vertical-align:top;" |183,061
| rowspan="1" style="vertical-align:top;" |3.2
| rowspan="1" style="vertical-align:top;" |-

| style="text-align:left;" |The Left – The Rainbow
| style="vertical-align:top;" |183,061
| style="vertical-align:top;" |3.2
| style="vertical-align:top;" |-8.6
| style="vertical-align:top;" |-
| style="vertical-align:top;" |-7

|-
! rowspan="1" style="text-align:left;vertical-align:top;" |Daniela Santanchè
| rowspan="1" style="vertical-align:top;" |93,077
| rowspan="1" style="vertical-align:top;" |1.6
| rowspan="1" style="vertical-align:top;" |-

| style="text-align:left;" |The Right – Tricolour Flame
| style="vertical-align:top;" |93,077
| style="vertical-align:top;" |1.6
| style="vertical-align:top;" |+0.5
| style="vertical-align:top;" |-
| style="vertical-align:top;" |-

|-
! rowspan="1" style="text-align:left;vertical-align:top;" |Eva Rossi
| rowspan="1" style="vertical-align:top;" |45,622
| rowspan="1" style="vertical-align:top;" |0.8
| rowspan="1" style="vertical-align:top;" |-

| style="text-align:left;" |Lega per l'Autonomia – Alleanza Lombarda
| style="vertical-align:top;" |45,622
| style="vertical-align:top;" |0.8
| style="vertical-align:top;" |-0.8
| style="vertical-align:top;" |-
| style="vertical-align:top;" |-

|-
! rowspan="1" style="text-align:left;vertical-align:top;" |Enrico Boselli
| rowspan="1" style="vertical-align:top;" |30,745
| rowspan="1" style="vertical-align:top;" |0.5
| rowspan="1" style="vertical-align:top;" |-

| style="text-align:left;" |Socialist Party
| style="vertical-align:top;" |30,745
| style="vertical-align:top;" |0.5
| style="vertical-align:top;" |-1.7
| style="vertical-align:top;" |-
| style="vertical-align:top;" |-

|-
! rowspan="1" style="text-align:left;vertical-align:top;" |Marco Ferrando
| rowspan="1" style="vertical-align:top;" |27,141
| rowspan="1" style="vertical-align:top;" |0.5
| rowspan="1" style="vertical-align:top;" |-

| style="text-align:left;" |Workers' Communist Party
| style="vertical-align:top;" |27,141
| style="vertical-align:top;" |0.5
| style="vertical-align:top;" |+0.5
| style="vertical-align:top;" |-
| style="vertical-align:top;" |-

|-
! rowspan="1" style="text-align:left;vertical-align:top;" |Renzo Rabellino
| rowspan="1" style="vertical-align:top;" |25,866
| rowspan="1" style="vertical-align:top;" |0.5
| rowspan="1" style="vertical-align:top;" |-

| style="text-align:left;" |List of Talking Crickets
| style="vertical-align:top;" |25,866
| style="vertical-align:top;" |0.5
| style="vertical-align:top;" |+0.5
| style="vertical-align:top;" |-
| style="vertical-align:top;" |-

|-
! rowspan="1" style="text-align:left;vertical-align:top;" |Others
| rowspan="1" style="vertical-align:top;" |86,632
| rowspan="1" style="vertical-align:top;" |1.5
| rowspan="1" style="vertical-align:top;" |-

| style="text-align:left;" |Others
| style="vertical-align:top;" |86,632
| style="vertical-align:top;" |1.5
| style="vertical-align:top;" |-1.7
| style="vertical-align:top;" |-
| style="vertical-align:top;" |-

|-
|- style="background-color:#E9E9E9"
! rowspan="1" style="text-align:left;vertical-align:top;" |Total coalitions
! rowspan="1" style="text-align:right;vertical-align:top;" |5,696,154
! rowspan="1" style="text-align:right;vertical-align:top;" |100.0
! rowspan="1" style="text-align:right;vertical-align:top;" |47
! rowspan="1" style="text-align:left;vertical-align:top;" |Total parties
! rowspan="1" style="text-align:right;vertical-align:top;" |5,696,154
! rowspan="1" style="text-align:right;vertical-align:top;" |100.0
! rowspan="1" style="text-align:right;vertical-align:top;" |=
! rowspan="1" style="text-align:right;vertical-align:top;" |47
! rowspan="1" style="text-align:right;vertical-align:top;" |=

Source: Ministry of the Interior

Lombard delegation to Senate

The People of Freedom
Roberto Formigoni (replaced by Riccardo Conti on 4 June 2008)
Alfredo Mantica
Ombretta Colli
Guido Possa
Alessio Butti
Giampiero Cantoni
Marcello Dell'Utri
Mario Mantovani
Romano Comincioli
Antonino Caruso
Luigi Scotti (replaced by Alessandra Gallone on 9 December 2008)
Antonio Tomassini
Giancarlo Serafini
Giuseppe Valditara
Giacomo Caliendo
Salvatore Sciascia
Valerio Carrara
Alfredo Messina
Pierfrancesco Gamba

Democratic Party
Umberto Veronesi
Mauro Ceruti
Pietro Ichino
Emanuela Baio
Gerardo D'Ambrosio
Daniele Bosone
Fiorenza Bassoli
Tiziano Treu
Luigi Vimercati
Antonio Rusconi
Guido Galperti
Cinzia Fontana
Giorgio Roilo
Paolo Rossi
Marilena Adamo

Lega Nord
Roberto Calderoli
Giuseppe Leoni
Rosi Mauro
Massimo Garavaglia
Cesarino Monti
Roberto Mura
Sandro Mazzatorta
Lorenzo Bodega
Fabio Rizzi
Armando Valli
Irene Aderenti

Italy of Values
Giuliana Carlino
Gianpiero De Toni

See also
 2008 Italian general election

Elections in Lombardy
2008 elections in Italy